Acting Corporal James Patrick Scully (20 October 1909 – December 1974), originally from Crumlin, Dublin,  of the Pioneer Corps, was awarded the George Cross for the valour he displayed on the night of 12th/13th March 1941 in Birkenhead in rescuing people from a bomb damaged building during the Blitz. The citation was published in the London Gazette on 8 July 1941, and reads:

Lieutenant C. C. Chittenden was awarded the George Medal for this along with Scully.

Medals and Awards 
Scully was recommended for his G.C. by the Chief Constable and the Mayor of Birkenhead, but the C.O. of 46 Group, Pioneer Corps, Temple Gray, quickly leapt into action on learning of the approval of the award from the G.O.C. Western Command, as recounted in Marion Hebblethwaite's One Step Further - The George Cross:

‘I then heard that Scully was to be presented to the King so I arranged for him to be fitted out by a skilled tailor. He was taken by a Sergeant to Liverpool and put on a train to London.

There he was met by an R.S.M. from the Brigade of Guards who took him to the War Office. Here he was quizzed by a number of Generals before being taken into a room and fitted with a new outfit supervised by two tailors.

The R.S.M. then gave him a light lunch in a Whitehall restaurant with no alcohol and they were driven to Buck House. He was taken up to see the King George VI, who asked him to sit down, was very kind, listened to his story and pinned the George Cross on him remarking that it was only the second one to be awarded. With his escort he then had an enormous high tea and was taken to a cinema; after a few drinks he was put on the train to Liverpool thoroughly bewildered by his crowded day. Warned by a message of his E.T.A., an escort of a Sergeant and four men was arranged to meet him, as it was thought his "Irish temperament" might have caused trouble but on arrival he was sound asleep.

Scully was the only member of the Pioneer Corps to be awarded the George Cross (although 13 George Medals and many other lesser awards have been won by Corps members.). No members of the Pioneer Corps have won the Victoria Cross while serving with the corps, although Francis George Miles served with the corps in World War II after winning the VC while serving with the Gloucestershire Regiment in World War I.

Corporal Scully's medal group including the George Cross was sold at auction in London on 5 July 2011 for £72,000 ($118,560.52 in 2022). The medals were sold with a quantity of documents, including his Soldier's Service and Pay Book; Buckingham Palace Coronation Medal 1953 as well as the certificate; membership certificate for the Royal Society of St George; 2 or 3 portrait photographs, and the cover feature of The Hornet of January 1967, featuring the recipient's GC-winning exploits. The auction was held by Dix Noonan Webb.

James Scully was the first Catholic recipient of a George Cross. He was commemorated by a sculpture at Simpson Barracks, Northamptonshire. A troop of the Royal Logistic Corps is named after him. 
Scully was one of the 409 George Cross recipients. The George Cross has been awarded 409 times, 394 to men, 12 to women.

Pioneer Corps 
James Patrick Scully enlisted in the Pioneer Corps in Belfast in January 1941 and was serving in 256 Company, Pioneer Corps, at the time of the above related incident in Carnforth Street, Birkenhead, on the night of 13–14 March 1941. Liverpool-Birkenhead suffered one of the biggest raids of the U.K. that night, aircraft from Luftflotte 3 dropping 58 tonnes of H.E. and over 4,000 incendiaries - this on the back of a larger raid on the 12th, when 264 people in Birkenhead were killed. Scully continued work through the Blitz which earned him the George Cross. The outstanding ‘Liverpool Blitz’ G.C. group of three awarded to Corporal James Scully, Royal Pioneer Corps, who shielded a trapped couple from debris for an entire night, all of them finally being saved after seven hours of frantic work by a rescue team. Scully remains the most highly decorated member of his Corps. Scully was discharged in May 1943 as ‘ceasing to fulfil Army Physical Requirements Para. 390 (xvi) King's Regulations 1940, being the result of great bravery for which he was awarded the George Cross’ (his discharge certificate refers).

After the War & Later Life 
After the War, Scully became a painter and decorator, and raised a large family with his wife Mary, namely a son (Tony) and five daughters who produced the happy couple 17 grandchildren. He was blessed with a wicked sense of humour and adored by his children.

Death 
Scully died suddenly in December 1974, while visiting his nephew  Brendan Foster the famous olympic runner, at Hebburn-on-Tyne (England).

See also
List of George Cross recipients

References

1909 births
Military personnel from Dublin (city)
Royal Pioneer Corps soldiers
Irish recipients of the George Cross
British Army personnel of World War II
Irish people of World War II
Irish soldiers in the British Army
1974 deaths